House of Frankenstein (a.k.a. House of Frankenstein 1997) is a 1997 television miniseries that revived Universal's threesome, the vampire, Frankenstein's monster and the werewolf. It starred Adrian Pasdar, Greg Wise and Teri Polo. It first aired on NBC in two parts on November 2 and November 3, 1997.

Characters
Adrian Pasdar as Vernon Coyle, a police detective trying to solve the case of "the Midnight Raptor"
Greg Wise as Crispian Grimes, a Dracula-like vampire who is known to the police as a serial killer nicknamed "the Midnight Raptor". He is the millionaire owner of the nightclub House of Frankenstein, which is secretly a haven for vampires.
Teri Polo as Grace Dawkins, a newly bitten werewolf who is also the love interest of detective Vernon Coyle and the heart's desire of Crispian Grimes
CCH Pounder as Dr. Shauna Kendall
Peter Crombie as Frankenstein's monster, discovered frozen in a block of ice and planned as an exhibit for House of Frankenstein, but escapes
Miguel Sandoval as Detective Juan 'Cha Cha' Chacon
Jorja Fox as Felicity, Grace's friend. Crispian turns her into a vampire when he visit Grace's apartment to which she joins his undead coven.
Richard Libertini as Armando
Karen Austin as Irene Lassiter

External links

1997 television films
1997 films
1990s American television miniseries
American television films
Dracula films
Fictional portrayals of the Los Angeles Police Department
Films directed by Peter Werner
Films scored by Don Davis (composer)
Films set in Los Angeles
Frankenstein films
American horror television films
NBC network original films
American serial killer films
Vampires in television
Television about werewolves
Universal Monsters
1997 horror films
1990s serial killer films
1990s American films